Greenlight Capital is a hedge fund founded in 1996 by David Einhorn. Greenlight invests primarily in publicly traded North American corporate debt offerings and equities. Greenlight is most notable for its short selling of Lehman stock prior to Lehman Brothers' collapse in 2008 and the $11 million fine they received in January 2012 for insider trading in the UK. Einhorn remains the fund's manager.

Overview
Founded in 1996 by Einhorn, with $900,000 (half borrowed from Einhorn's parents), Greenlight had generated greater than a twenty-five percent annualized net return for its investors, but recent lackluster results have brought this to under fifteen percent  It prospered in its early days by identifying weak financial firms for short selling, making significant gains from Conseco, CompuCredit, Sirrom Capital, and Resource America. It also manages a fund of funds and a private equity fund through its affiliates, Greenlight Masters and Greenlight Private Equity Partners. It also operates Greenlight Capital Re, a property/casualty reinsurer. Unlike other funds, Greenlight does not use borrowed money, or leverage. The firm does not generate large trading volumes.
In June 2008 there were 25 employees, including nine analysts and one trader. It occupies a single high floor of an office building near Grand Central, in New York City.

History
A few months before the dot-com bust, Greenlight lost 4% of its total capital on a short on Chemdex stock as it soared in price. A few months after Greenlight closed its position, Chemdex stock plunged to $2.

In the third quarter of 2008, Greenlight lost 15% of its value, primarily from long positions on industrial companies like Helix Energy Solutions, when the SEC temporarily banned short selling of financial stocks. With the majority of Greenlight's money in bonds and long positions on stocks, this stopped hedge funds minimizing 'long' losses or offsetting them with short gains. Greenlight ended 2008 down 23%, its first annual loss.  In 2009 Greenlight recouped its losses from 2008.

Einhorn and Greenlight Capital were fined by the FSA for insider trading in January 2012.

Greenlight Capital was down 20 percent for 2015.

In February 2015, Greenlight Capital was ranked 53rd out of 58 hedge funds, with a D grade, in the Institutional Investor's Alpha Hedge Fund Report Card. This was the second year in a row Greenlight Capital received a D from IIA.

Greenlight Capital greatly underperformed the bull market in 2017.  For January 2018, Greenlights funds were down 6% for the month where the S&P 500 was up 5.6%.

In March 2020 the fund posted loss of 21.5% as the global coronavirus pandemic drove the stock markets down.

Top equity holdings
As of 2019, the top equity holdings of the firm were in the shares of the following companies: Green Brick Partners, Brighthouse Financial, Ensco, General Motors, Exela Technologies, CONSOL Coal Resources, and Altus USA.

Greenlight Capital lowered its stake in Apple by 6.2 percent to 8.6 million shares during the fourth quarter of 2014, despite Apple shares being up 15 percent in the year.

Philanthropy
In 2009, Greenlight Capital donated $7.2 million to three charities: Tomorrows Children's Fund, the Center for Public Integrity (CPI) and the Project on Government Oversight (POGO). The Tomorrows Children's Fund received $2.6 million, CPI received $1.8 million, and POGO received $1.8 million.

Political contributions
In 2012, Greenlight Capital ranked 5th out of WNYC's top 10 hedge fund political donors. The hedge fund contributed $592,729.88 to New York State political campaigns in 2012.

References

External links

Greenlight Capital up 4.3 percent in third quarter - letter

Hedge fund firms in New York City
Lehman Brothers
Financial services companies established in 1996